Georgios Oikonomidis (born 29 October 1978) is a Greek former sprinter who competed in the 2000 Summer Olympics.

Honours

References

1978 births
Living people
Greek male sprinters
Olympic athletes of Greece
Athletes (track and field) at the 2000 Summer Olympics
Athletes from Piraeus
Mediterranean Games gold medalists for Greece
Mediterranean Games medalists in athletics
Athletes (track and field) at the 2001 Mediterranean Games